The Siamese rock gecko (Cnemaspis siamensis) is a species of geckos. It is endemic to Thailand. No subspecies are listed.

References

Cnemaspis
Geckos of Thailand
Endemic fauna of Thailand
Reptiles described in 1925